The Second Amendment Caucus, also known as the House Second Amendment Caucus, is a congressional caucus consisting of conservative and libertarian Republican members of the United States House of Representatives who support Second Amendment rights. It was formed in 2016 to "promote a pro-gun agenda" according to founding chairman Thomas Massie.

Electoral results

History 
The Second Amendment Caucus was originally established in 2004 by Representative Marilyn Musgrave (R-CO) and existed under that name until 2008. Representative Paul Broun (R-GA) recreated it in 2009 and titled it the Second Amendment Task Force. Thomas Massie reestablished it in December 2016 in light of the 2016 election results with 13 other congressmen.

Members

Former members

See also 
 Freedom Caucus
 Liberty Caucus

References

External links 

Political organizations based in the United States
Caucuses of the United States Congress
Republican Party (United States)
2016 in American politics
Political organizations established in 2016
Republican Party (United States) organizations
Libertarian organizations based in the United States
Factions in the Republican Party (United States)
Tea Party movement
Ideological caucuses of the United States Congress
Conservative organizations in the United States